Johannesteijsmannia magnifica   is a species of Johannesteijsmannia from Malaysia, Selangor.

References

External links
 
 

magnifica